Havan (English: Offering Prayers to God in Front of Fire) is an Indian television drama series that premiered on 26 September 2011 and ended on 30 March 2012. It aired on Colors on weekday evenings. The show is produced by Rajan Shahi of Director's Kut Productions.

Plot
Havan is a story about a devotee and God. It is true that one unites with God only after one's life, but what if a devotee meets her God in real life? Not only that, what if she is connected to him through a relationship? Havan tries to deal with such a relationship and tries to explore relationships built around this premise.

Havan, although a story of God and devotee, is not a religious show. Instead, it tries to understand the human side of the whole set up, the interrelationships, the conflicts within, the idea of faith and belief, and the power of love. It deals with a gamut of human emotions in our society, without getting judgmental about the society or a person in particular.

Cast

Main
 Narendra Jha as Hari Om Baapji
 Shrenu Parikh as Aastha
 Kunal Verma as Atharva

Recurring
 Shubhangi Atre Poorey as Trushna
 Prachi Thakker as Manjali
 Aarya Dharmchand Kumar as Yajur
 Darshan Kumar
 Darpan Shrivastava
 Preeti Chaudhary as Hari Om's daughter
 Sanjay Swaraj
 Samta Sagar as Lajjo
 Pankaj Bhatia
 Pracheen Chauhan as Keerat

References

External links
Havan on IMDb

2011 Indian television series debuts
Indian television soap operas
Colors TV original programming
2012 Indian television series endings